The men's singles wheelchair tennis tournament at the 2016 Paralympic Games in Rio de Janeiro was held at the Olympic Tennis Centre in the Barra Olympic Park in Barra da Tijuca in the west zone of Rio de Janeiro, Brazil from 9 to 16 September 2016.

Great Britain's Gordon Reid defeated compatriot Alfie Hewett in the final, 6–2, 6–1 to win the gold medal in men's singles wheelchair tennis at the 2016 Rio Paralympics. With the win, Reid became the singles world No. 1. In the bronze-medal match, Belgium's Joachim Gérard defeated France's Stéphane Houdet.

Japan's Shingo Kunieda was the two-time defending gold medalist, but was defeated by Gérard in the quarterfinals.

Seeds 

  (semifinals, fourth place)
  (semifinals, bronze medalist)
  (champion, gold medalist)
  (third round)
  (quarterfinals)
  (quarterfinals)
  (quarterfinals)
  (third round)

  (third round)
  (quarterfinals)
  (second round)
  (third round)
  (final, silver medalist)
  (third round)
  (third round)
  (third round)

Draw

 BPC = Bipartite Invitation

Finals

Top half

Section 1

Section 2

Bottom half

Section 3

Section 4

References

Men's singles